

Events

Publications

Births
 November 12 – Roland Barthes, French philosopher (d. 1980)

Deaths

Philosophy
20th-century philosophy
Philosophy by year